The white-bearded antshrike (Biatas nigropectus) is a species of bird in the family Thamnophilidae, the only member of the genus Biatas. It is endemic to the Atlantic forest of Argentina and Brazil.

The white-bearded antshrike is a bamboo specialist. It is threatened by habitat loss.

Taxonomy
The white-bearded antshrike was described by the French ornithologist Frédéric de Lafresnaye in 1850 and given the binomial name Anabates nigro-pectus.
The genus was erected by the German ornithologists Jean Cabanis and Ferdinand Heine in 1860 with the white-bearded antshrike as the type species. The specific name combines the Latin words niger meaning "black" and pectus meaning "breast". The name of the genus is from the Ancient Greek biatas meaning "tyrant".

Ecology
In Argentina, the white-bearded antshrike has been found only in Guadua bamboo, especially yatevo (Guadua trinii). It feeds on insects that it gleans from bamboo. It is a cryptic species that rarely sings so very little is known about its ecology.

Conservation
The white-bearded antshrike is globally Vulnerable. The main threat to this species is habitat loss from clearing of bamboo.

References

External links
BirdLife Species Factsheet.

white-bearded antshrike
Birds of the Atlantic Forest
white-bearded antshrike
Taxonomy articles created by Polbot
Taxa named by Frédéric de Lafresnaye
Taxa named by Jean Cabanis
Taxa named by Ferdinand Heine